Mangur may refer to:
Manjur (instrument)
Mangur (tribe), one of the largest Kurdish tribes of Eastern Kurdistan
Mangur, Afghanistan
Mangur, India
Mangur-e Gharbi Rural District, Iran
Mangur-e Sharqi Rural District, Iran
Mangur (Vikas Dada Tanawade)